The MG GS is the first sports utility vehicle (SUV) to be produced by MG Motor at its plant in China. It was launched at the Auto Shanghai Motor Show in April 2015.

About

The GS was launched at the Auto Shanghai Motor Show in April 2015, it closely resembles the MG CS Concept, that was shown at the same show in 2013. The GS design was directed by Anthony Williams-Kenny, in a collaboration between Shanghai and Longbridge development centres.

The GS was launched in the United Kingdom in May 2016, at the London Motor Show, with sales beginning later that year. It is assembled in Lingang, Shanghai, China. A revised GS was launched in 2017 for the Chinese market. The revisions to the new model included a revised exterior styling with main changes to the front and rear bumpers.

In addition to the revisions made to the exterior, changes in specification to the Chinese models were made, such as direct running lights on all models. An updated interior also joined the changes, with improved materials and redesigned air vents similar to the interior of the new MG ZS SUV, to bring it in line with the rest of the range.

Engines
Initial models are powered by two petrol engines. The 1.5 litre CUBE-TEC engine was developed in conjunction with General Motors and is commonly referred to as the GM Small Gasoline Engine (SGE).

The engine was developed in conjunction with German car manufacturer Opel. The 2.0L Engine is not available in the United Kingdom, but is available in other markets.

Chassis
The MG GS utilises a new scalable SUV platform developed with parent company SAIC Motor. The Roewe RX5 also makes use of this new scale able platform, and other SAIC products are expected to follow on the platform. The GS comes in two derivatives, a front-wheel drive and an all-wheel drive set up.

All wheel drive is not offered in the United Kingdom, but is available in other markets such as China and Thailand.

CS Concept

The MG CS Concept was unveiled at the 2013 Shanghai Motor Show. The concept car is designed to slot into the compact SUV sector, one of the fastest growing areas of the global automotive market, where style and sports utility dominate fashion trends.

The CS concept is the result of a large investment into the brand by MG’s owner, SAIC. The CS previewed MG’s first production SUV, the GS. The CS was designed by a design team led by MG’s Global Design Director, Anthony Williams-Kenny between the Longbridge and Shanghai design studios.

The MG CS has many strikingly unique features, including the headlights which have a multi faceted ‘shard’ structure which refract light in different colours and shape from the side, but coalesce to form the iconic MG’s trademark octagon from the front.

A strong horizontal emphasis gives the side profile of the MG CS a distinctive, sporty style and youthful appearance. Creative design, style and charisma dominate the look of this latest MG. There has been much speculation about an MG SUV, and this model is expected to create a sensation among young, fashion conscious people. The MG CS concept will expand the global reach of the MG brand.

iGS
The MG iGS is a "smart driving" concept car developed by SAIC (Shanghai Auto) and premiered at the 2015 Shanghai Motor Show. It is based on the MG GS compact SUV. The "i" the name of the concept stands for "Information," "Internet," "Innovation," and "Intelligent." According to SAIC, the iGS can accomplish a set of tasks without a driver when traveling between 60–120 km/h: cruising, following and overtaking other cars, lane keeping and changing.

Remote and self parking are also said to be among the smart features. The MG GS IGS was independently developed by SAIC Motor and applied automatic control, artificial intelligence and visual computation. It frees the driver completely from the traditional people vehicle road closed loop, and has used a series of cutting edge technologies.

Advertising
A series of adverts were shown on television in the United Kingdom over the summer of 2016, based around the role of the car in a typical nuclear family's (Mum, Dad, Jack and Polly) everyday life. The message behind the first advert was finding any excuse to take the GS out for a drive and take the family out for a pizza, the following adverts were more activity based. The adverts have acquired a cult status on YouTube.

Sales

References

External links

GS
Cars introduced in 2015
2010s cars
Cars of China
Crossover sport utility vehicles
Front-wheel-drive vehicles
Compact sport utility vehicles